The 1954 Western Kentucky Hilltoppers football team represented Western Kentucky State College (now known as Western Kentucky University) as a member of the Ohio Valley Conference (OVC) during the 1954 college football season. Led by seventh-year head coach Jack Clayton, the Hilltoppers compiled an overall record of 6–4 with a mark of 2–3 in conference play, tying for second place in the OVC. The team's captains were Jerry Passafiume and Jim Phifer.

Schedule

References

Western Kentucky
Western Kentucky Hilltoppers football seasons
Western Kentucky Hilltoppers football